Douglas Howard Bagguley (31 May 1909 – 11 December 1999) was a Canadian skier. He competed in the Nordic combined event at the 1932 Winter Olympics.

References

External links
 

1909 births
1999 deaths
Canadian male Nordic combined skiers
Olympic Nordic combined skiers of Canada
Nordic combined skiers at the 1932 Winter Olympics
Skiers from Ottawa